The Longview Farm House near Adairville, Kentucky, United States, was listed on the National Register of Historic Places in 1992.

The main building of the farm complex is a wood frame, clapboarded I-house built in about 1851.

References

Houses on the National Register of Historic Places in Kentucky
Italianate architecture in Kentucky
Houses completed in 1851
Houses in Logan County, Kentucky
1851 establishments in Kentucky
National Register of Historic Places in Logan County, Kentucky
I-houses in Kentucky
Greek Revival architecture in Kentucky